The Sporting Challenger is a professional tennis tournament played on outdoor red clay courts. It is currently part of the Association of Tennis Professionals (ATP) Challenger Tour. It is held annually at the Circolo della Stampa in Turin, Italy, since 2002.

Past finals

Singles

Doubles

External links
Official website
ITF search

 
ATP Challenger Tour
Tretorn SERIE+ tournaments
Clay court tennis tournaments
Sport in Turin
Tennis tournaments in Italy